Zulma Ramona Gómez Cáceres (9 January 1961 – 31 July 2022) was a Paraguayan physician and politician of the Authentic Radical Liberal Party. She was a member of the Chamber of Deputies from 2003 to 2008 and Senate of Paraguay from 2008 until her death.

Political career
Gómez served as a senator for Paraguay from 2008 until her death. She was previously a deputy from 2003 to 2008. She was a member of the Authentic Radical Liberal Party (PLRA), although she also declared herself a supporter of Horacio Cartes, former president of Paraguay of the Colorado Party.

Gómez was involved in several controversies and, on several occasions, used vulgar language to defend herself. This included supporting Cartes's re-election plans in 2017 (which resulted in the 2017 Paraguayan crisis) and defending Colorado Senator Óscar González Daher, after the leaking of audios that revealed that he committed influence peddling (which is illegal under Paraguayan law), which earned Gómez several requests for suspension in the PLRA. Gómez also admitted to having applied for positions in Itaipú Binacional and exercising influence peddling herself "to help people".

Death
Gómez was found dead on the morning of 31 July 2022 on the shores of Lake Acaray in Ciudad del Este. Accounts provided by her relatives indicated that the night before, Gómez held a political meeting with young people, on a farm she owned, after which she had slept on a mattress on a dock at the lakeside farm. A granddaughter twice asked Gómez to go inside the house, but she instead both times refused, stating that she needed to "reflect", and when the granddaughter went a third time, she no longer found her. A coroner who examined the body stated that the cause of death was suffocation due to drowning, and that the body presented injuries consistent with an apparent accidental fall, but that authorities would also carry out a toxicological analysis.

News of Gómez's death received international coverage. As a result of her death, the Congress of Paraguay declared three days of mourning.

References

1961 births
2022 deaths
Authentic Radical Liberal Party politicians
Members of the Senate of Paraguay
Members of the Chamber of Deputies of Paraguay
21st-century Paraguayan women politicians
21st-century Paraguayan politicians
Paraguayan physicians
Women physicians
Deaths by drowning